Seth Wallace (born January 8, 1979) is an American football coach. He is currently the linebackers coach and assistant defensive coordinator for the Iowa Hawkeyes football team.  He played collegiately at Coe College as a wide receiver.

Playing career 
Wallace grew up in Grinnell, Iowa, and played wide receiver at Grinnell High School. Wallace's father coached the Grinnell College football team. Wallace attended Coe College in Cedar Rapids, Iowa, playing football and earning a bachelor's degree in physical education. Wallace was a team captain and twice earned all-conference honors as a wide receiver, while also leading the nation in punt returns in 1997.

Coaching career 
Wallace began coaching at his alma mater Coe as a wide receivers, tight ends, and special teams coach in 2001 and 2002. Wallace moved to Lake Forest College, coaching for three seasons as defensive backs, special teams coach, and offensive coordinator. Wallace joined Kirk Ferentz's staff at Iowa as graduate assistant from 2006 to 2008, working with Phil Parker and the Iowa defensive backs. Wallace earned his master's degree in sports management from the University of Iowa in 2008.

Valdosta State 
Wallace joined the Valdosta State football staff, coaching in various defensive roles from 2009 until 2013. Wallace was Blazers' defensive coordinator from 2011 to 2013, working under head coach David Dean.

Iowa 
Wallace returned to Iowa in 2014, working in various defensive and recruiting roles before settling in as the Hawkeyes linebackers coach after Jim Reid joined Boston College as defensive coordinator. Wallace coached several future NFL players at linebacker for the Hawkeyes, including Josey Jewell, Nick Niemann, Ben Niemann, and Kristian Welch. Wallace became assistant defensive coordinator for the Hawkeyes in 2017, working with defensive coordinator Phil Parker. After the conclusion of the 2022 season, Wallace was named the national FootballScoop Linebackers Coach of the Year.

In April 2022, Wallace was added as a defendant in a lawsuit filed against the University of Iowa and its football coaches by former Black football players who allege they faced racial discrimination and harassment.

References 

Living people
Coe College alumni
Iowa Hawkeyes coaches
Valdosta State Blazers football coaches
Educators from Iowa
1979 births
Sportspeople from Iowa
People from Grinnell, Iowa